Leigh is a civil parish in the district of East Staffordshire, Staffordshire, England.  It contains 20 buildings that are recorded in the National Heritage List for England.  Of these, two are listed at Grade II*, the middle grade, and the others are at Grade II, the lowest grade.  The parish contains the villages of Church Leigh, Lower Leigh, Upper Leigh, and Withington and smaller settlements, and is otherwise rural.  Most of the listed buildings in the parish are houses, cottages, and farmhouses, and the others include a church, memorials in the churchyard, a school, and three mileposts.


Key

Buildings

References

Citations

Sources

Lists of listed buildings in Staffordshire